

The Parable of the Workers in the Vineyard (also called the Parable of the Laborers in the Vineyard or the Parable of the Generous Employer) is a parable of Jesus which appears in chapter 20 of the Gospel of Matthew in the New Testament. It is not included in the other canonical gospels. It has been described as a difficult parable to interpret.

Text

Interpretations

The parable has often been interpreted to mean that even those who are converted late in life earn equal rewards along with those converted early, and also that people who convert early in life need not feel jealous of those later converts. An alternative interpretation identifies the early laborers as Jews, some of whom resent the late-comers (Gentiles) being welcomed as equals in God's Kingdom. Both of these interpretations are discussed in Matthew Henry's 1706 Commentary on the Bible. 

An alternative interpretation is that all Christians can be identified with the eleventh-hour workers. Arland J. Hultgren writes: "While interpreting and applying this parable, the question inevitably arises: Who are the eleventh-hour workers in our day? We might want to name them, such as deathbed converts or persons who are typically despised by those who are longtime veterans and more fervent in their religious commitment. But it is best not to narrow the field too quickly. At a deeper level, we are all the eleventh-hour workers; to change the metaphor, we are all honored guests of God in the kingdom. It is not really necessary to decide who the eleventh-hour workers are. The point of the parable—both at the level of Jesus and the level of Matthew's Gospel—is that God saves by grace, not by our worthiness. That applies to all of us."

Some commentators have used the parable to justify the principle of a "living wage", though generally conceding that this is not the main point of the parable. An example is John Ruskin in the 19th century, who quoted the parable in the title of his book Unto This Last. Ruskin did not discuss the religious meaning of the parable but rather its social and economic implications.

See also

 Life of Jesus in the New Testament
 Ministry of Jesus

References

Workers in the Vineyard, Parable of the
Gospel of Matthew